JDBCFacade is an open source library for making JDBC easier to use and less error prone while encouraging a clean separation between persistence and domain logic.

Technical Details 
JDBCFacade supports J2SE 1.2 and later.  This includes JDBC version 2.0 and later.

Unlike many similar tools, JDBCFacade does not interfere with the normal usage of JDBC in any way.  JDBCFacade uses the command and abstract factory patterns to provide a simplified database api that hides many of the details of connection and error handling from the user.

JDBCFacade supports 4 types of commands:

 FetchCommand – executes a JDBC query (SELECT) statement that is expected to return zero or more rows and then uses the provided factory to create an object from each of those rows
 GetCommand – executes a JDBC query (SELECT) statement that is expected to return exactly one row and then uses the provided factory to create an object from that row
 UpdateCommand – Executes a JDBC statement that does not return a ResultSet, such as an update or DDL statement
 VisitCommand – Executes a JDBC query (SELECT) statement that is expected to return zero or more rows and then applies the provided visitor to each of those rows

External links 

 JDBCFacade's Official Website
 Command Pattern
 Abstract Factory Pattern

Java (programming language) libraries